The Beebe Bridge is a two-lane, steel through arch bridge crossing the Columbia River at Chelan Falls, Washington. Located three miles east of Lake Chelan, the bridge is part of U.S. Route 97 and averages 5000 vehicle crossings per day.

It is one of three "Continuous-steel through-truss tied-arch" bridges in the state. The Blue Bridge over the Columbia in the Tri-Cities, and the Elmer Huntley Bridge over the Snake are of the same design. Seismically retrofitted in 2000, the Beebe Bridge was considered to be in very good condition following its last structural safety inspection in 2007. In 1959 WSDOT began construction of the current bridge, which was opened in June 1963 for a cost $1,120,000.

History

The bridge is named after The Beebe Orchard Company which built the first bridge, a reinforced concrete tower suspension bridge, in 1919, over the Columbia River at Chelan Falls to carry irrigation water in two 12-inch water flumes from springs on the west side to their orchards on the east side of the river. The Beebe Bridge was the first suspension bridge in Washington State, was completed at a cost of $75,000, and was, at the time, the largest privately built and owned bridge in the world.

By 1947 the Beebe Orchard Company was the state's largest apple growing enterprise operated by a single family.

Although not originally intended for public vehicle crossing, the historic bridge's  wooden-deck roadway aided in fruit transport and helped the company recoup the cost of extending the water pipeline by instituting crossing tolls. Although the water flumes were removed in 1926, the private toll bridge remained in use until it was replaced by the current state bridge in 1963.

The state began construction of the present bridge in 1959 and had completed the piers before the reservoir behind Rocky Reach dam, also known as Lake Entiat, inundated the site. During continued construction, legal maneuvering by the orchard company brought the project to a halt for over a year. The Beebe Orchard Company finally agreed to accept a one-time payment of $4,000 for its property and interests. The old suspension bridge was dismantled but its concrete towers were left in place and can still be seen just downstream (south) of the new span.

August 2009 closure
On August 31, 2009 a semi-truck collision severely damaged the Beebe Bridge's steel trusses and beams forcing its closure. Traffic was detoured to U.S. Route 97A. The bridge was repaired and reopened on October 9, 2009 at a cost of $1.5 million.

Images

See also
 
 
 
 List of crossings of the Columbia River

References

External links

Beebe Bridge Closure - WSDOT
WSDOT Beebe Bridge Repair Photoblog - WSDOT

Bridges over the Columbia River
Bridges in Chelan County, Washington
Road bridges in Washington (state)
U.S. Route 97
Bridges of the United States Numbered Highway System
Former toll bridges in Washington (state)
Bridges completed in 1963
1963 establishments in Washington (state)
Steel bridges in the United States
Tied arch bridges in the United States
Truss bridges in the United States